Men Without Women is the debut solo studio album by American musician Steven Van Zandt, credited as Little Steven and the Disciples of Soul. It was released on October 1, 1982 by EMI America. The title track was inspired by the Ernest Hemingway collection of short stories of the same name.

Background 
In 1980, Van Zandt produced Dedication, a comeback album for singer Gary U.S. Bonds. Gary Gersh,  who was in charge of the Bonds album at EMI America Records, subsequently approached  Van Zandt and indicated that the label would be interested in a Van Zandt solo project. In November 1981, Van Zandt began recording the album at The Power Station, using musicians from the E Street Band,   the Asbury Jukes and the Miami Horns. Among the songs recorded at these sessions were "Inside of Me", "Princess of Little Italy" and "I've Been Waiting," the last of these originally written by Van Zandt for the Jukes album Hearts of Stone. Bruce Springsteen also took part in these sessions, providing backing vocals on "Angel Eyes",   "Until The Good Is Gone" and "Men Without Women". Springsteen’s contributions, however, went uncredited but have been confirmed in interview by Van Zandt.

Before finishing Men Without Women,  Van Zandt produced a second Bonds album, On the Line, and also began recording Born in the U.S.A.  with Springsteen. By Summer 1982, Van Zandt had recruited his own band, the Disciples of Soul, featuring drummer Dino Danelli and bassist Jean Beauvoir, and it was this line up that completed the album, recording "Under the Gun" and "Lyin' in a Bed of Fire". Van Zandt had also decided to adopt the pseudonym Little Steven, partly to distance himself from any Springsteen comparisons and partly as a tribute to Little Richard and Little Walter. On July 18, 1982, Little Steven and the Disciples of Soul made their live debut at the Peppermint Lounge in New York City. The concert was filmed for video release  and as a  companion to the album. On May 13 the film version of Men Without Women was given a European premiere at the Cannes Film Festival.

As a single, "Forever" spent nine weeks on the Billboard Hot 100, peaking at #63. The album did little better, reaching only #118 on the Billboard 200. A music video for "Forever" was played in heavy rotation on early MTV. "Inside of Me" was later featured on The Sopranos in which Van Zandt himself also starred.

On July 2, 2011, the album was performed in its entirety by Southside Johnny and the Asbury Jukes at The Stone Pony in Asbury Park, NJ. Richie La Bamba, Mark Pender, Ed Manion and Stan Harrison from the original Disciples of Soul were part of the horn section.

In 2019, the album was remastered for release as part of Van Zandt's career-spanning box set Rock N Roll Rebel: The Early Work. The digital deluxe edition of the album was released on October 18, 2019 containing 10 bonus tracks, including the previously unknown studio outtake "Time".

Track listing 
All songs written by Steven Van Zandt, except where noted.
 "Lyin' in a Bed of Fire" – 4:23
 "Inside of Me" – 5:03
 "Until the Good Is Gone" – 4:01
 "Men Without Women" – 2:49
 "Under the Gun" – 3:59
 "Save Me" – 4:52
 "Princess of Little Italy" – 5:14
 "Angel Eyes" – 4:32
 "Forever" – 3:56
 "I've Been Waiting" – 3:54

2019 digital deluxe edition bonus tracks
 "Men Without Women radio spot" (1982) - 1:15
 "Angel Eyes" (Britt Row version, 1982 – previously unreleased) - 4:29
 "Forever" (Britt Row version, 1982 – previously unreleased) - 3:39
 "Until the Good Is Gone" (Britt Row version, 1982 – previously unreleased) - 4:52
 "I've Been Waiting" (early version, 1982 – previously unreleased) (with Southside Johnny) - 3:57
 "Caravan" (Juan Tizol, Duke Ellington) (live, 7" single, 1982) - 3:57
 "Save Me" (live at Peppermint Lounge, New York, NY, July 18, 1982 – previously unreleased) - 5:06
 "Time" (studio track, 1982 – previously unreleased) - 5:01
 "Princess of Little Italy" (Vin Scelsa Hungerthon, 1995 – previously unreleased) - 6:04
 "This Time It's for Real" (live at Marquee Club, London, UK, October 18, 1982/Live at Peppermint Lounge, New York, NY, July 18, 1982 – previously unreleased) - 5:26

Personnel

Musicians 
 Steven Van Zandt – lead vocals, guitar
 The Disciples of Soul
 Jean Beauvoir – bass, backing vocals
 Dino Danelli – drums on "Under the Gun" and "Lyin' in a Bed of Fire" 
 Monti Louis Ellison – percussion, berimbau, djembe
 Zoë Yanakis – oboe solo on  "Under the Gun"
 The E Street Band
Clarence Clemons – backing vocals
 Danny Federici –  organ, accordion
 Garry Tallent – bass
 Bruce Springsteen – backing vocals on "Angel Eyes", "Until the Good Is Gone" and "Men Without Women" 
 Max Weinberg – drums
 La Bamba's Mambomen
 Mark Pender – trumpet
 Mike Spengler – trumpet
 Stan Harrison – tenor sax, flute
 Richie "La Bamba" Rosenberg – trombone, backing vocals
 Eddie Manion – baritone sax, solo on  "Forever" 
 Additional musicians
 Manolo Badrena – percussion 
 Gary U.S. Bonds – backing vocals
 John "J.T." Bowen – backing vocals
 Felix Cavaliere – piano,  organ
 Rusty Cloud – organ
 Sammy Figueroa – percussion
 Kevin Kavanaugh – piano
 Benjamin Newberry – chimes
 Bob Werner – tambourine

Technical 
 Steven Van Zandt – producer, arranger
 Bob Clearmountain – engineer, mixing on "Forever"
 Toby Scott – engineer on "Under the Gun", "Lyin' in a Bed of Fire" and "I've Been Waiting", mixing engineer 
 Garry Rindfuss – additional engineer
 Zoë Yanakis – assistant engineer
 Josh Abbey – assistant engineer
 Malcolm Pollack – assistant engineer
 Dana Bisbee – assistant engineer
 Bobby Cohen – assistant engineer
 Wally Traugott – mastering (at Capitol Records, Los Angeles)
 Bill Burks – art direction
 Henry Marquez – art direction
 Dino Danelli – art direction assistance
 Mike Diehl – art direction assistance
 Jim Marchese – photography

Charts

Album

Singles

References 

1982 debut albums
Steven Van Zandt albums
Albums produced by Steven Van Zandt
Capitol Records albums